Luisiella is an extinct genus of prehistoric bony fish that lived during the Kimmeridgian stage of the Late Jurassic epoch. Fossils of the genus have been found in either the Cañadón Calcáreo Formation or Cañadón Asfalto Formation in Chubut Province, Argentina.

See also 
 List of prehistoric bony fish genera

References

Bibliography

Further reading 
 Bocchino, A. (1967). Luisiella inexcutata gen. et sp. nov. (Pisces, Clupeiformes, Dussumieriidae) del Jurásico superior de la provincia de Chubut, Argentina. Ameghiniana 4, 91–100.

Prehistoric ray-finned fish genera
Late Jurassic fish
Kimmeridgian life
Prehistoric fish of South America
Jurassic Argentina
Fossils of Argentina
Fossil taxa described in 1967